Events in the year 2023 in Latvia.

Incumbents
President: Egils Levits
Prime Minister: Arturs Krišjānis Kariņš

Events
Ongoing  COVID-19 pandemic in Latvia
2023 Latvian presidential election

Deaths 

 8 January: Gundars Bērziņš, 63, accountant and politician, minister of finance (2000–2002).

References

 
2020s in Latvia
Years of the 21st century in Latvia
Latvia
Latvia